Frederick William I  (20 August 1802 – 6 January 1875) was, between 1847 and 1866, the last Prince-elector of Hesse-Kassel (or Hesse-Cassel).

Early life 
He was born at Hanau on 20 August 1802. He was the son of Prince William, later William II, Elector of Hesse, and Princess Augusta of Prussia, daughter of King Frederick William II of Prussia. During the French occupation of Hesse-Kassel from 1806 to 1813, he stayed with his mother in Berlin. Reportedly, he had a poor relationship with his father because of his father's affair with Emilie Ortlöpp.

Frederick was educated at Marburg and Leipzig.

Career
On 30 September 1831, he became co-regent and, in 1847, Prince-elector. Under influence of his minister Hans Daniel Ludwig Friedrich Hassenpflug, he conducted a reactionary policy, which made him very unpopular. He was forced to give in to the demands of the March Revolution, but reinstated Hassenpflug in 1850 after the revolution had been crushed.

In the Austro-Prussian War of 1866, he chose the side of Austria. His capital, Kassel, was occupied by Prussia, and, as a consequence of his refusal to negotiate, he was transferred as a prisoner to Stettin on 23 June. Hessen-Kassel was annexed by Prussia in the same year.

Frederick William never accepted the Prussian dominance over his territory. Even after the creation of the unified German Empire in 1871, he tried to regain his throne.

Personal life 
 
On 26 June 1831 Frederick William was morganatically married to Gertrude Falkenstein Lehmann (1803–1882). She had been born in Bonn and was a daughter of apothecary Johann Gottfried Falkenstein and his wife, Magdalena Schulz. When Frederick William met Gertrude, she was the wife of Lt Karl Michael Lehmann (married in 1822) and the mother of two sons. Gertrude and her husband were divorced in 1830/31, but already by this time, some children had been born to her and Frederick William. They were married in 1831, after which they had further children. 

In 1831, Frederick William's father William II made Gertrude Her Illustrious Highness Countess of Schaumburg. In 1853, she was made Princess of Hanau and Horowitz. All of the nine children that she bore to Frederick William, whether born before or after their marriage, were made Princes of Hanau, and granted the style of Serene Highness in 1862, including:

 Augusta Marie Gertrude (1829–1887), who married Ferdinand Maximilian III, Prince of Isenburg-Büdingen (1824–1903) in Wächtersbach in 1849.
 Alexandrine (1830–1871), who married Prince Felix zu Hohenlohe-Oehringen (1818–1900), youngest son of August, Prince of Hohenlohe-Öhringen, in 1851.
 Friedrich Wilhelm (1832–1889), who married, morganatically, twice Auguste Birnbaum in 1856 and, in 1875, Ludowika Gloede; their children were Counts von Schaumburg, but post-1918 descendants bear the title Prince and Princess von Hanau.
 Moritz (1834–1889), who married, morganatically, Anne von Lossberg in 1875; no children.
 Wilhelm (1836–1902), who married Princess Elisabeth of Schaumburg-Lippe, daughter of George William, Prince of Schaumburg-Lippe, in 1868; they divorced in 1870 and he married Countess Elisabeth of Lippe-Weissenfeld (1868–1952) in 1890; neither marriage produced children.
 Maria (1839–1917), who married Prince William of Hesse-Philippsthal-Barchfeld (1831–1890) in 1857. They divorced in 1872 and Maria and her children were granted the titles HSH Prince/ss of Ardeck after her divorce.
 Karl (1840–1905), who married Countess Hermine Grote in 1882; they did not have children.
 Heinrich (1842–1917), who married, morganatically, Martha Riegel.
 Philipp (1844–1914), who married, morganatically, Albertine Hubatschek-Stauber; their children bear the title Count and Countess von Schaumburg.

He died at Prague in 1875, where his widow also died on 9 July 1882. Because of his morganatic marriage, his sons were excluded from succession. He was succeeded, as titular Prince-elector of Hesse, by Prince Frederick William of Hesse, from the house of Hesse-Rumpenheim.

Honours 
 Grand Cross of the House Order of the Golden Lion
 18 June 1821: Knight of the Order of the Black Eagle
 1837: Grand Cross of the Order of St. Stephen
 April 1844: Knight of the Order of St. Andrew the First-called
 15 February 1846: Grand Cordon of the Order of Leopold
 29 January 1848: Knight of the Order of the Elephant
 13 August 1865: Grand Cross of the House Order of the Wendish Crown

Ancestry

Notes and references

 

|-

|-

|-
 

1802 births
1875 deaths
People from the Electorate of Hesse
House of Hesse-Kassel
Protestant monarchs
German exiles
University of Marburg alumni
Leipzig University alumni
Prince-electors of Hesse
Grand Crosses of the Order of Saint Stephen of Hungary